Babi Dół railway station is a railway station serving the town of Babi Dół, in the Pomeranian Voivodeship, Poland. The station opened in 1932 and is located on the Nowa Wieś Wielka–Gdynia Port railway. The train services are operated by SKM Tricity.

History
During the German occupation, the station was called Babental.

Formerly the station had an important role in freight transport, it mainly served as a point of loading wood from nearby forests. Today, the station is commonly used by trip lovers, as a popular route along the Valley of Radunia starts in Babi Dół. Additional rails are now dismantled.

Modernisation
In 2014 a new platform was built to replace the old platform.

Station building
The whole complex of the Babi Dół station was built in the 1920s during  the construction of the main coal line from Silesia to Gdynia. Both main buildings and auxiliary buildings (warehouse and toilets) were built in dominating in those times "national" style, which resembles architecture from the region of Lublin and Kazimierz.
Nowadays the building is closed and serves as living quarters. No ticket office is available at the station.

Other buildings
A non-operational signal box building is located nearby the station. The building is largely devastated, lacking even doors or windows. No bridge or tunnel was ever present at this station.

Train services
The station is served by the following services:
Pomorska Kolej Metropolitalna services (R) Kościerzyna — Gdańsk Port Lotniczy (Airport) — Gdańsk Wrzeszcz — Gdynia Główna
Pomorska Kolej Metropolitalna services (R) Kościerzyna — Gdańsk Osowa — Gdynia Główna

References

Babi Dół article at Polish Stations Database, URL accessed at 6 March 2006
Babi Dół at kartuzy.info, URL accessed at 13 March 2006
Description of trip to Babi Dół at www.kaszuby.agro.pl, URL accessed at 13 March 2006
 This article is based upon a translation of the Polish language version as of July 2016.

External links

Railway stations in Pomeranian Voivodeship
Kartuzy County
Railway stations in Poland opened in 1932